Kanzaq (also known as Ganzaq, Ganzegh, Genzek, Kanzag, and Katīraq) is a village in the Central District of Sareyn County, Ardabil Province, Iran. At the 2006 census, its population was 868 in 207 families.

References 

Tageo

Towns and villages in Sareyn County